Daniil Vladimirovich Chertov (born 15 November 1990) is a Russian former professional football player.

Career
On 29 January 2020, FC Okzhetpes announced that they had re-signed Chertov on a contract until the end of 2020.

Career statistics

References

External links
 
 

1990 births
Footballers from Moscow
Living people
Russian footballers
Russian expatriate footballers
FC Torpedo Moscow players
FC Metallurg Lipetsk players
FC Sokol Saratov players
FC Vityaz Podolsk players
FC Khimki players
Expatriate footballers in Kazakhstan
FC Okzhetpes players
Kazakhstan Premier League players
Association football defenders